The D5000 is a 12.3-megapixel DX-format DSLR Nikon F-mount camera, announced by Nikon on 14 April 2009. The D5000 has many features in common with the D90. The D5000 seems to have been discontinued in November 2010.

It was the second Nikon DSLR camera to feature movie mode after the feature was introduced by the D90, though this capability has now been extended to other models as well, such as the D300S and the D3S. Some newer models are even capable of 1080p 24 frame/s video, such as the Nikon D3100, Nikon D5100 and the Nikon D7000. As with the D90, each uninterrupted movie shot at 720p is limited to 5 minutes duration and 20 minutes for all other resolutions (the D7000 can do 20 min movies). One-button Live View mode features subject tracking and face detection auto-focus modes.

Features 

 Nikon's 12.3-megapixel Nikon DX format CMOS sensor.
 Nikon EXPEED image/video processor.
 D-Movie mode (24 frame/s with mono 22 kHz sound). Selectable from 320 x 216 pixels, 640 x 424 pixels or 1,280 x 720 pixels (720p).
 Active D-Lighting (4 levels and Auto).
 Automatic correction of lateral chromatic aberration for JPEGs. Correction-data is additionally stored in RAW-files and used by Nikon Capture NX, View NX and some other RAW tools.
 Auto lens distortion ("Distortion") correction and Perspective Control as well as image rotation ("Straighten") via playback ("Retouch") menu
 2.7-inch articulated 230,000-dot resolution TFT LCD with +180/-90 degree tilt and 180 degree rotation.
 Live View shooting mode with Contrast Detect and subject tracking auto focus (activated with a dedicated button).
 Continuous Drive up to 4 frames per second.
 3D Color Matrix Metering II with Scene Recognition System.
 3D Tracking Multi-CAM 1000 autofocus sensor module with 11 AF points.
 ISO sensitivity 200 to 3200 (100–6400 with boost, respectively called LO-1 and HI-1).
 Nikon F-mount lenses.
 i-TTL flash exposure system without built-in wireless control (no Commander-mode, but support for SU-800 wireless speedlight commander). Compatibility: SB-400, SB-600, SB-700, SB-800, SB-900, SB-910, R1C1 and third party manufacturers
 Auto scene recognition mode with 19 pre-programmed scenes.
 Inbuilt time-lapse photography intervalometer
 Quiet shooting mode.
 Shutter rated to 100,000 cycles.
 Built-in sensor cleaning system (vibrating low-pass filter) and airflow control system.
 HDMI HD video output.
 Support for GP-1 GPS geotagging unit.
 File formats: JPEG, NEF (Nikon's RAW, 12-bit compressed), AVI (Motion JPEG).
 EN-EL9a Lithium-ion Battery, Battery Life (shots per charge) approx.: 510 shots (CIPA).

Like the Nikon D40, Nikon D40X, Nikon D60, Nikon D3000, Nikon D3100 and Nikon D5100, the D5000 has no in-body autofocus motor, and fully automatic autofocus requires a lens with an integrated autofocus-motor. With any other lenses the camera's electronic rangefinder can be used to manually adjust focus.

Can mount unmodified A-lenses (also called Non-AI, Pre-AI or F-type) with support of the electronic rangefinder and without metering.

Reception 
Dxomark published a detailed analysis where they rated the sensor of the D5000 in terms of image noise, dynamic range and color depth about 2/3 stops better than the Canon 500D / T1i, which was visible in real-life comparisons made by Camera Labs. DxOmark's camera sensor ranking places the D5000 above its competitors and even higher priced cameras like the Canon EOS-1D Mark III and Canon EOS 5D, partly due to a high dynamic range.

The Nikon D5000 has been tested by many independent reviewers.

Recall 
In late July 2009, there was a recall due to a problem that was discovered with the camera's power systems. The flaw would cause the system to cease powering on, both when running on battery or wall outlet power. For affected serial numbers, see Nikon advisory.

The service includes fast shipping both ways to the repair shop with most people receiving their fixed camera within 2 weeks. On August 12, 2009, Nikon notified that some registered users of the Nikon D5000 who sent their camera in for repairs would need to send it in for additional repairs.

See also
List of Nikon F-mount lenses with integrated autofocus motors

References

External links 

 Nikon D5000 Product Page at Nikon Global

D5000
D5000
Live-preview digital cameras
Cameras introduced in 2009
Articles containing video clips